Language Teaching Research is a peer-reviewed journal that publishes research within the area of second or foreign language teaching. Although articles are written in English, the journal welcomes studies dealing with the teaching of languages other than English as well. The journal's editors-in-Chief are Hossein Nassaji (University of Victoria) and María del Pilar García Mayo (University of the Basque Country). The journal was established in 1997 and is currently published by SAGE Publications. The journal is a venue for studies that demonstrate sound research methods and which report findings that have clear pedagogical implications. A wide range of topics in the area of language teaching is covered, including:Programme
Syllabus
Materials design
Methodology
The teaching of specific skills and language for specific purposes

Abstracting and indexing 
Language Teaching Research is abstracted and indexed in Scopus and the Social Sciences Citation Index. According to the Journal Citation Reports, its 2017 impact factor is 2.086, ranking it 16 out of 181 journals in the category "Linguistics" and 50 out of 238 journals in the category "Education & Educational Research".
The journal is abstracted and indexed by:
Academic Search Premier
Contents Pages in Education
Current Index to Journals in Education
Educational Research Abstracts Online - e-Psyche
IBZ: International Bibliography of Periodical Literature
IBZ: International Bibliography of Periodical Literature in the Humanities and Social Sciences
International Bibliography of Book Reviews of Scholarly Literature in the Humanities and Social Sciences
International Bibliography of Book Reviews of Scholarly Literature on the Humanities and Social Sciences
Language Teaching
Linguistics Abstracts
Linguistics and Language Behavior Abstracts
MLA Abstracts of Articles in Scholarly Journals
MLA International Bibliography
Social Science Abstracts
Sociological Abstracts

References

External links 
 

SAGE Publishing academic journals
English-language journals
Publications established in 1997
Quarterly journals
Language education journals